Released 2005/09/28, Iroha is the debut album from j-Rock band, Chirinuruwowaka TOCT-25739, ¥3059 (tax included)

Track listing
 Kasugai (カスガイ Pledge of Love)
 Hanamuke (はなむけ Farewell Gift)
 Taruto (タルト Tart)
 Koke No Mushita Konna Yo Wa (苔の生したこんな代は; This Generation is Growing Moss)
 Cigar (シガー)
 Hai To Rou (灰と朗 Ash and Calm)
 Kagerou (蜻蛉 Mayfly)
 Noironiteiru (ノイロニテイル Similar Colors)
 Shikon Noise (紫紺ノイズ Blue Violet Noise)
 Yosuga (ヨスガ Reliable)
 Konohagisu (コノハギス Like Floating Leaves)
 Nazuki (なずき Brain)

2005 debut albums
Chirinuruwowaka albums